The Rio San Jose is a  tributary of the Rio Puerco in the U.S. state of New Mexico.

Course

The Rio San Jose's farthest tributary stream is Bluewater Creek; its headwaters are in the Zuni Mountains, near the continental divide in Cibola County, with about 400 feet of the course in McKinley County. The Rio San Jose proper starts at the confluence of Bluewater Creek and Mitchell Draw near Bluewater Village. Entering Valencia County, it flows southeast, through Grants, then turning east near McCartys, flowing through the Acoma Indian Reservation and Laguna Pueblo. The remains of an ancient dam constructed by the Laguna people sometime between 1370–1750 AD is situated within Laguna Pueblo. Below Mesita the river turns southeast again, flowing through a narrow canyon before joining the Rio Puerco in Bernalillo County.

The entire course of the river below Bluewater Creek is roughly paralleled by the BNSF Railway tracks (formerly the Atlantic and Pacific Railroad, built around 1882, later absorbed into the AT&SF). Between Bluewater Village and Mesita the river valley provides the route for old U.S. Route 66 and I-40.

Hydrology
The water level and streamflow of the Rio San Jose has been measured at a number of sites in Cibola County, New Mexico. Stream gauges have been operated by the USGS near Laguna, Correo, and at Acoma Pueblo, near Grants.
 
The gauge at Acoma Pueblo has a record that commenced in 1937, and is the only one still active.

Since the 1870s the flow of the upper river has been substantially modified by demands for irrigation, groundwater abstraction and a dam on the Bluewater Creek.

See also
 List of rivers of New Mexico

References

Tributaries of the Rio Grande
Rivers of New Mexico
Rivers of Cibola County, New Mexico
Rivers of Valencia County, New Mexico
Rivers of Bernalillo County, New Mexico